Skipsfjorden may refer to:
Skipsfjorden, Magerøya, a bay on the eastern side of Magerøya in Nordkapp municipality in Finnmark
Skipsfjorden, Karlsøy, part of the Fugløyfjorden in Karlsøy municipality in Troms
Skipsfjorden, Torsken, part of the Torskenfjorden in Torsken municipality in Troms
Skipsfjorden, Dønna, part of Stifjorden in Dønna municipality in Nordland